"Dangerous" is the first single by the Ying Yang Twins taken from their album Chemically Imbalanced.

Song information
The song features Wyclef Jean and Mr. Collipark, and is produced by Wyclef Jean. It contains samples from Ram Jam's version of Black Betty. It also interpolates the chorus of the Hall & Oates song "Maneater".

Music video
The "Dangerous" music video is based on the movie Sin City, beginning by "Twin City" and like Sin City it is completely in black and white style with occasional colorization including the girls in the video who are in color. The music video was directed by Melina.

Charts

References

Ying Yang Twins songs
2006 singles
Wyclef Jean songs
Music videos directed by Melina Matsoukas
Song recordings produced by Jerry Duplessis
TVT Records singles
Song recordings produced by Wyclef Jean
Songs written by Daryl Hall
Songs written by Sara Allen
Songs written by John Oates
Songs written by Wyclef Jean
Songs written by Jerry Duplessis
2006 songs
Songs written by Mr. Collipark
Crunk songs
Songs written by Lead Belly